Count Vladimir Fyodorovich Adlerberg I (born Eduard Ferdinand Woldemar von Adlerberg 21 November 1791 – 29 March 1884) was a general in the Imperial Russian Army and a Russian government minister.

Early life 
He was the youngest son of a Swedish Colonel Gustav Friedrich Adlerberg (1738-1794) by his second wife, Baltic-German, Anna Charlotta Juliana von Baggehufwudt (1760-1839). Born into the Adlerberg noble family, which traces its lineage back to the Archbishop of Uppsala, Olov Svebilius whose children were ennobled with the name of Adlerberg.

Life
Sources are unclear whether he was born in Vyborg or Saint Petersburg, but it is certain that he entered the military in 1811 as an officer in the Lithuanian Guard Infantry Regiment, with which he campaigned in 1812 and 1814. In 1817 he became adjutant and confidant to Grand Duke Nicholas, who he supported during the Decembrist uprising on 14 December 1825 and on whose staff he served as a major general during the Russo-Turkish War of 1828.

He became a lieutenant general in 1833 and between 1842 and 1852 served as Director General of the Post Office. In 1843 he was promoted to General of the Infantry, then four years later he was made a count, finally becoming a minister and chancellor of the orders in 1852. He fully backed Nicholas' authoritarian policies and acted as a personal servant to the tsar, used for several secret missions and duties. He retained some influence under Alexander II of Russia but did not support his liberal reforms.

In 1870, aged 79, he retired from public office, succeeded as minister by his eldest son Alexander, count Adlerberg II. (* 1819), General of the Infantry and Adjutant General, who during the last Russo-Turkish War was appointed to the general staff by Alexander III of Russia but removed from that role immediately after becoming a minister. Wladimir's second son, Count Nikolay Adlerberg, was another General of the Infantry and Adjutant General, who also acted as governor-general of Finland and wrote the 1853 book "From Rome to Jerusalem".

Honours and arms

 :
 Knight of the Imperial Order of the Iron Crown, 1st Class, 1833
 Grand Cross of the Royal Hungarian Order of Saint Stephen, 1849
 : Knight of the House Order of Fidelity, 1857; in Diamonds, 1863
 :
 Grand Cross of the Order of Merit of the Bavarian Crown, 1838
 Knight of the Order of Saint Hubert, 1857
 : Grand Cross of the Ludwig Order, 16 June 1838
 : Grand Cross of the House and Merit Order of Peter Frederick Louis, with Golden Crown, 3 August 1853
 : Grand Cross of the Order of Prince Danilo I, 1869
  Kingdom of Prussia:
 Knight of Honour of the Johanniter Order, 16 January 1821; in Diamonds, 1825
 Knight of the Order of the Red Eagle, 1st Class, 23 November 1834; in Diamonds, 1843
 Knight of the Order of the Black Eagle, 3 June 1851; in Diamonds, 1856
 : Grand Cross of the Order of the White Falcon, 12 September 1838
  Sweden-Norway: Commander Grand Cross of the Order of the Sword, 12 June 1838
 : Knight of the Order of Saint Januarius, 1845
 : Grand Cross of the Order of the Württemberg Crown, 1846

References

External links 
  Genealogisches Handbuch der baltischen Ritterschaften, Estland, Görlitz 1930
  Stammtafel-Übersicht der von Adlerberg in Estland
  
  BBLD - Baltisches biografisches Lexikon digital

1791 births
1884 deaths
Russian people of Swedish descent
Russian military personnel of the Napoleonic Wars
Politicians of the Russian Empire
19th-century politicians from the Russian Empire
Counts of the Russian Empire
Grand Crosses of the Order of Saint Stephen of Hungary
Commanders Grand Cross of the Order of the Sword